Helicopter Sea Combat Squadron 21 (HSC-21), nicknamed "Blackjacks", is an aviation unit of the United States Navy based at Naval Air Station North Island. HSC-21 is made up of five expeditionary detachments that deploy aboard ships including Combat Logistics Force support ships, Hospital Ships and Amphibious Assault ships, among others.  HSC-21 flies the Sikorsky MH-60S Seahawk helicopter.

History
HSC-21 was established as Helicopter Combat Support Squadron 11 (HC-11) "Gunbearers" on 1 October 1977 at Naval Air Station North Island, San Diego, California (United States), to provide logistics support for the units of the United States Pacific Fleet. In April 2005, HC-11 was redesignated HSC-21 "Blackjacks".  During Operation Iraqi Freedom HSC-21 had shore base detachment as a part of the 2515th Naval Air Ambulance Detachment, Udari Army Airfield, Kuwait.  This detachment closed in Fall 2012.

See also

 History of the United States Navy
 List of United States Navy aircraft squadrons

References

External links
HSC-21 Official Website 

Helicopter sea combat squadrons of the United States Navy